Dead Air is a 2007 Hong Kong horror film produced by Teddy Chen. The film is the directorial debut of Xavier Lee and the first lead role for AV idol Derek Tsang. The supernatural crime drama also features Leila Tong, Terence Yin, Raymond Wong Ho-yin, Jo Kuk, Wayne Lai, and Susan Tse.

Plot
Rock (Derek Tsang), the director of a poorly rated TV program, encounters a female ghost called Tincy (Tong Ling). Rock helps Tincy deliver her baby from her recently deceased body. In return, Tincy helps Rock create a new reality show called "Life on the Line." The show features contestants attempting to overcome deadly traps to win cash prizes. It becomes a big hit, but soon Rock uncovers a conspiracy behind Tincy's death and is framed for her murder.

Cast
 Derek Tsang
 Raymond Wong Ho-yin
 Terence Yin
 Wayne Lai
 Jo Kuk
 Leila Tong Ling
 Susan Tse

References

2007 films
2000s Cantonese-language films
2000s supernatural horror films
Hong Kong supernatural horror films
2000s Hong Kong films